Benjamin I. Cook is an American climatologist with a number of publications to his name.  Along with the Lamont–Doherty Earth Observatory, for instance, he used paleorecords to reconstruct land cover in Mexico’s Yucatán and other Central American regions.

Notes 
 Weather History Offers Insight Into Global Warming. The New York Times 15 Sep 2008. Last accessed 10 Dec 2011.

References 

Living people
Year of birth missing (living people)
American climatologists
Columbia University faculty